Sheka may refer to:
Sheka Zone, in the Southern Nations, Nationalities and Peoples' Region (SNNPR), Ethiopia
Sheka (kingdom), a former kingdom located in Ethiopia
Sheka (mythology), a dwarf in the Tatar mythology
Sheka (rural locality), a rural locality (a selo) in the Republic of Tatarstan, Russia